Forest City Library may refer to:

Forest Grove City Library, a library in Forest Grove, Oregon
Forest City Public Library, a historic building located in Forest City, Iowa
Forest City Library, a branch of the Live Oak Public Libraries in Georgia